Anne Leonard Bredon (born Anne Loeb; September 7, 1930 – November 9, 2019) was an American folk singer, best known for composing the song "Babe I'm Gonna Leave You" while she was a student at University of California, Berkeley in the late 1950s. Bredon was the daughter of physicist Leonard Benedict Loeb and granddaughter of physiologist Jacques Loeb. She majored in art at Humboldt State University and completed her master's degree in mathematics at Berkeley, California.

Some time around 1960, while attending Berkeley, Bredon appeared on a live folk-music radio show, The Midnight Special, on radio station KPFA singing "Babe I'm Gonna Leave You". Janet Smith, another folk singer, developed her own version of the song and performed it on the same radio show some time later, catching the attention of Joan Baez who used the song on Joan Baez in Concert, Part 1 (1962).  The song was initially credited as "Traditional, arr. Baez" but properly attributed on Baez's 1964 sheet music, The Joan Baez Song Book.

The English rock band Led Zeppelin covered the song after hearing Baez's version, crediting the song as "Traditional, arr. Page". In the 1980s, Bredon was made aware of Led Zeppelin's version of the song and so, since 1991, this version has been credited to Anne Bredon/Jimmy Page & Robert Plant. Bredon also received a substantial back-payment of royalties.

Bredon married Lee Johannsen in 1951. She divorced in 1959, leaving her first two children, Lenore and Joel, with her ex-husband. Later, she married Glen Bredon, a mathematics professor at UC Berkeley. In 1969, they moved to Rutgers University in New Jersey where they raised their two children, Joelle and Aaron.

She lived for many years in North Fork, California where she was active in the Sierra Mono Museum designs and sold beaded jewelry. Bredon was also a Navajo-style rug-weaver and basket-weaver, focusing on Mono Indian. She possessed an extensive knowledge of the complex aspects of harvesting and preparation of grasses and materials used in traditional California "Indian" basket weaving.

Bredon died November 9, 2019, in Clovis, California.

References

1930 births
2019 deaths
American folk singers
American women singers
American people of German-Jewish descent
American Ashkenazi Jews
California State Polytechnic University, Humboldt alumni
Jewish American artists
Jewish American musicians
Jewish folk singers
Musicians from Berkeley, California
Singers from California
University of California, Berkeley alumni
21st-century American Jews
21st-century American women